Aniba vulcanicola is a species of plant in the family Lauraceae. It is endemic to Ecuador.  Its natural habitat is subtropical or tropical moist montane forests.

References

vulcanicola
Endemic flora of Ecuador
Vulnerable plants
Taxonomy articles created by Polbot